Roberto Zulueta (born 14 November 1957) is a Cuban handball player. He competed in the men's tournament at the 1980 Summer Olympics.

References

1957 births
Living people
Cuban male handball players
Olympic handball players of Cuba
Handball players at the 1980 Summer Olympics
Place of birth missing (living people)